Doto columbiana is a species of sea slug, a nudibranch, a marine gastropod mollusc in the family Dotidae.

Distribution
This species was first described from specimens dredged at 22–33 m depth between Brandon Island and the head of Departure Bay and two more from Nanoose Bay, Vancouver Island, British Columbia, Canada. It has been reported from the Pacific coast of North America from British Columbia to Santa Barbara, California.

Description
This species of Doto has a cream coloured body with grey mottled markings on the back and sides. This pigment can vary from pale grey-brown to almost black in some individuals. The dark pigment forms rings around the bases of the cerata in well-marked specimens.

EcologyDoto columbiana feeds on the hydroid Aglaophenia'' sp., family Aglaopheniidae.

References

Dotidae
Gastropods described in 1921